James Edward Clephane-Cameron (born 10 October 1985) is a poet from East Sussex, UK. He is the son of the historian Neil Clephane-Cameron. Beyond his work as a writer he has campaigned for the restoration and continued use of historic computing.

Work
Clephane-Cameron has been actively writing and published since 2014. Beyond his written work he has also campaigned for the use of historic computing equipment for education, appearing in a BBC study on the topic in 2016.

Poetry and prose
Clephane-Cameron's first published work was an anthology of poetry released in May 2014. The collection, covering a number of different topics, was written in sonnet form and named for its main work "The Green Man". The title poem looked at the folk lore of the Green Man or "Jack the Green", a mischievous spirit from Old-English folk lore.

In November 2015, Clephane-Cameron's work was republished by CS Publishing of Seattle, including a new cover and artwork, and a follow-up book entitled Tales from the Green-Wood was announced and later released in January 2016.

In May 2017 a new book titled The Coming Storm was announced and then released on 1 July 2017 in paperback and e-book. The book was billed as containing "a collection of eight short stories set to poetic verse."

In August 2017 a book entitled The Last Resort was announced as the opening volume of a series entitled The Diary of Oliver Rees The book was billed as "a tale of mystery, mayhem and murder" at the space age titular venue "The Last Resort" (a location described as being on the very edge of space and time).

Lost book
Towards the end of 2014 a book entitled Jude of Lincoln was announced as "Coming Soon". Despite discussion of the book and the following of its progress by a number of fans, the book was pulled from publication in the Summer of 2015 and removed from all online listings.

Bibliography
 The Green Man: and Other Poems (2015)
 "Fall"
 "Insomnia"
 "Lost"
 "For Her"
 "The Green Man"
 "The Elf Maid"
 "Borrowed"
 "Coffee"
 "Buzz"
 "Call"
 "A Christmas Prayer"

 Tales from the Green Wood (2016)
 "The Forester's Box"
 "The Silversmith's Daughter"
 "The Hunter's Folly"
 "The Creature's Lament"
 "The Prince's Den"

 The Coming Storm (2017)
 "The Battle"
 "Dawn"
 "The Coming Storm"
 "The Horseman in the Mist"
 "The Craftsman"
 "Friends"
 "The Very End"
 "The Tailor's Timely Twist"

 The Diary of Oliver Rees (2017)
 "The Last Resort"

References 

English male poets
1985 births
Living people